Jan Kiesser is a cinematographer who won a Leo Award for the 2006 film Fido and many other nominations including a Primetime Emmy Award.

References

External links

Canadian cinematographers
Living people
Year of birth missing (living people)